Zakyah  is a Syrian town located in Markaz Rif Dimashq, Rif Dimashq. According to the Syria Central Bureau of Statistics (CBS), Zakiyah had a population of 18,553 in the 2004 census.

History
In 1838, Eli Smith noted Zakyah's population being Sunni Muslims.

References

Bibliography

 

Populated places in Markaz Rif Dimashq District